Slash's Blues Ball was an American blues rock band that formed in Los Angeles, California in 1996. The band members comprised lead guitarist Slash, lead vocalist Teddy "Big Bag Zig Zag" Andreadis, bassist Johnny Griparic, drummer Alvino Bennet, rhythm guitarist Bobby Schneck and saxophonist Dave McLaurin. 

They were formed by Slash after his departure from the group Guns N' Roses due to creative and personal disagreements. Andreadis had already worked with Slash in Guns N' Roses as an instrument technician and occasional live keyboardist or harmonica player. Slash's Blues Ball were a cover band, performing various hard rock, R&B and blues rock songs by the likes of Jimi Hendrix, B.B. King, Bob Dylan, and Fleetwood Mac.

The band was active for two years, and did not release any albums but various live recordings have circulated among fans.

Band members
Slash – lead guitar
Teddy Andreadis – lead vocals, harmonica, keyboards
Alvino Bennet – drums
Johnny Griparic – bass
Dave McLaurin – saxophone
Bobby Schneck – rhythm guitar

References

1996 establishments in California
1998 disestablishments in California
American blues rock musical groups
Hard rock musical groups from California
Musical groups disestablished in 1998
Musical groups established in 1996
Musical groups from Los Angeles
Slash (musician)